William H. DeBevoise (1826 – October 2, 1886) was an officer in the Union Army during the American Civil War. He served a lieutenant colonel of the famed 14th Brooklyn (New York State Militia).

Biography
DeBevoise enlisted in the 14th Brooklyn on April 18, 1861, in Brooklyn, for a term of three years. He was 35 years of age at the time of his enlistment, and was mustered in as captain of Company H. He was promoted on October 1, 1862, and then commissioned as a lieutenant colonel on October 24, 1862, when Col. Edward B. Fowler was wounded. DeBevoise led the 14th at the battles of South Mountain and Antietam during the Maryland Campaign. He was discharged for disability on May 11, 1863. 

Following the war, DeBevoise became the colonel of the 14th Regiment, New York National Guard, 1869–1878.

References
The History of the Fighting Fourteenth, by Tevis & Marquis.

Union Army officers
People of New York (state) in the American Civil War
Eastern Iron Brigade
1826 births
1886 deaths